Hsu Ping-chien (born 8 October 1994) is a Taiwanese artistic gymnast. He competed at the Asian Games in 2010 and 2014. He also competed at the World Artistic Gymnastics Championships in 2017 and 2019.

At the 2019 Summer Universiade in Naples, Italy, he won the silver medal in the men's team all-around event. In the same year, he competed at the 2019 World Artistic Gymnastics Championships held in Stuttgart, Germany.

References

External links 
 

Living people
1994 births
Place of birth missing (living people)
Taiwanese male artistic gymnasts
Gymnasts at the 2010 Asian Games
Gymnasts at the 2014 Asian Games
Asian Games competitors for Chinese Taipei
Universiade medalists in gymnastics
Universiade silver medalists for Chinese Taipei
Competitors at the 2017 Summer Universiade
Medalists at the 2019 Summer Universiade
21st-century Taiwanese people